List of notable and former player from Vancouver Whitecaps Women.

Players 
  Paige Adams 
  Amber Allen
  Nikki Ambrose
  Justine Bernier
  Melanie Booth
  Myriam Bouchard	
  Taryne Boudreau	
  Natalie Boyd	
  Chelsea May Buckland
  Jenna Carosio
  Allysha Chapman	 
  Candace Chapman
  Gurveen Clair	
  Caitlin Davie	
  Alison Fenter
  Jonelle Filigno
  Martina Franko
  Janine Frazao
  Mele French
  Brittany Galindo
  Kasia Gwiazda 		
  Elizabeth Hansen
  Randee Hermus
  Eden Hingwing 
  Penelope Hughes
  Selenia Iacchelli
  Jenny Jeffers 
  Danielle Johnson		
  Rita Keimakh
  Kaylyn Kyle 
  Lauren Lachlan
  Monica Lam-Feist	
  Kara Lang
  Sydney Leroux
  Ella Masar
  Erin McLeod
  Mary McLaughlin
  Tessa Meyer
  Tiffeny Milbrett
  Marissa Mykines
  Andrea Neil
  Taylor Patterson
  Jenna Richardson
  Jodi-Ann Robinson	
  Molly Rouse
  Clare Rustad
  Jaclyn Sawicki
  Sophie Schmidt	
  Nicole Setterlund
  Desiree Scott
  Brienna Shaw
  Christine Sinclair
  Rheanne Sleiman
  Demi Stokes
  Sanna Talonen
  Alicia Tesan	
  Katie Thorlakson
  Brittany Timko
  Erin Uchacz	
  Brandi Vega
  Alyssa Williamson	
  Shannon Woeller		
  Nikki Wright  
  Marie Yempuku
  Emily Zurrer

Notable players 

 
 
 
 
 

 
 
 
 
 
 
 
 
 
 
 
 
 
 
 
 
 
 
 
 
 
 
 
 
 
 
 
 
 
 
 

 List
Vancouver Whitecaps Women
Association football player non-biographical articles
Lists of sportswomen